The Jammu Metro is a proposed light rail transit system for the city of Jammu in the Indian Union Territory of Jammu and Kashmir. The project has been proposed by the Housing and Urban Development Department of the Government of Jammu and Kashmir and is estimated to cost Rs. 4825 crores in phase 1. The proposed system will have a total route length of 43.50 km, consisting of 4 lines and 22 stations, and will be completed in two phases. The expected completion date for the project is 2026.

The Jammu and Kashmir state government has announced plans to introduce a metro rail system in the city of Jammu. To conduct a traffic analysis, the government hired the services of the infrastructure development enterprise RITES. Additionally, the government approached the Delhi Metro Rail Corporation to prepare a detailed project report, including feasibility and financial viability.

Construction
It is expected that the official plan for the Jammu Metro will be launched in 2022-23, with construction to follow thereafter. This will also coincide with the construction of the Srinagar Metro.

Routes 
The Jammu Metro project will be completed in two separate phases.

Phase 1
The first phase will consist of two lines.

Line 1 : Bantalab - Satwari - Greater Kailash
 Lenth : 17 km
 Station : 17
 Type : Elevated
 Depot: Bantalab

Line 2: Udheywala - Exhibition Ground
 Lenth: 6 km
 Station: 6
 Type: Elevated
 Depot: Udheywala

See also
 Jammu
 Srinagar Metro
 Urban rail transit in India

References 

Light rail in India